The 1950 Bulgarian Cup Final was the 10th final of the Bulgarian Cup (in this period the tournament was named Cup of the Soviet Army). It was contested by Levski Sofia and CSKA Sofia. It took three matches at People's Army Stadium to determine a winner. The first took place on 26 November, the second on 27 November and the third on 3 December 1950. The cup was won by Levski Sofia. They won the 2nd replay 1–0 after extra time.

First game
Levski Sofia 1–1  CSKA Sofia
Goalscorers: Hranov ; Panayotov 
Levski: Spas Andreev, Dimitar Iliev, Ivan Dimchev (c), Amedeo Kleva, Dimitar Doychinov (28' Georgi Kardashev), Angel Petrov, Borislav Tsvetkov, Dragan Georgiev, Arsen Dimitrov, Lyubomir Hranov, Yordan Tomov
CSKA': Stefan Gerenski, Georgi Tsvetkov, Manol Manolov, Georgi Nasev, Atanas Tsanov, Gavril Stoyanov, Stefan Stefanov, Stefan Bozhkov (c), Panayot Panayotov, Kostadin Blagoev, Gocho Rusev (24' Asen Panayotov)
Date: 26 November 1950
Stadium: People's Army Stadium
Attendance: 30,000

Second game
Levski Sofia 1–1  CSKA Sofia
Goalscorers: Takev ; Bozhkov 
Levski: Dimitar Elenkov, Atanas Dinev (c), Dimitar Iliev, Amedeo Kleva, Dragan Georgiev, Angel Petrov, Borislav Tsvetkov, Todor Takev, Arsen Dimitrov, Lyubomir Hranov , Yordan Tomov
CSKA': Stefan Gerenski, Georgi Tsvetkov, Manol Manolov, Borislav Futekov, Atanas Tsanov , Gavril Stoyanov, Stefan Stefanov, Stefan Bozhkov (c), Stoyne Minev, Gancho Vasilev, Kiril Bogdanov 
Date: 27 November 1950
Stadium: People's Army Stadium
Attendance: 30,000

Third game

Details

See also
1950 A Group

References

Bulgarian Cup finals
PFC CSKA Sofia matches
PFC Levski Sofia matches
Cup Final